Table tennis competitions at the 2014 Commonwealth Games in Glasgow, Scotland took place between 24 July and 2 August at the Scotstoun Sports Campus.

Medal table

Medallists

Participating nations

References

External links
Official results book – Table Tennis

 
2014 Commonwealth Games events
2014
Commonwealth Games
Table tennis competitions in the United Kingdom